Colin Aamodt (27 June 1921 – 17 June 2011) was an Australian rules footballer who played for and coached the North Adelaide in the South Australian National Football League (SANFL).  Aamodt won North Adelaide's Best and Fairest in his debut season as a 19 year old and went on to have an excellent, but interrupted by war, career with the club.  Following his playing career, Aamodt took up coaching, leading Nailsworth High School to the 1952 SA Public Schools Amateur Sports Association premiership, followed by coaching North Adelaide's Senior Colts to the 1954 premiership, which led to being appointed senior coach of North Adelaide from 1955 to 1957.

Aamodt was also a professional sprinter, winning the military 100 yards championship in 1942, 75 yard and 100 yard State Championship in 1947, and finished third in the 1941 Stawell Gift.

References

External links 

1921 births
2011 deaths
North Adelaide Football Club players
North Adelaide Football Club coaches
Australian rules footballers from South Australia
Australian Army personnel of World War II
Australian Army soldiers